Makaro-Petrovskoye is a rural locality in Naumovsky Selsoviet Rural Settlement, Konyshyovsky District, Kursk Oblast, Russia. Population:

Geography 
The village is located at the source of the Verbny Brook (a right tributary of the Chmacha River in the Svapa River basin), 47 km from the Russia–Ukraine border, 81 km north-west of Kursk, 19 km north-west of the district center – the urban-type settlement Konyshyovka, 6 km from the selsoviet center – Naumovka.

 Climate
Makaro-Petrovskoye has a warm-summer humid continental climate (Dfb in the Köppen climate classification).

Transport 

The rural locality is situated 86 km from Kursk Vostochny Airport, 179 km from Belgorod International Airport and 287 km from Voronezh Peter the Great Airport.

References

Notes

Sources

Rural localities in Konyshyovsky District